Picasso & Lump: A Dachshund's Odyssey is a 2006 book by David Douglas Duncan that features professional photographs of Pablo Picasso and his dachshund, Lump. The book, published by Thames & Hudson, gives an insight into Picasso's later life, and Picasso the man, not the image. The book contrasts black-and-white photos of Picasso, his wife Jacqueline, and Lump with Picasso's colourful interpretations, which feature Lump, of Diego Velázquez's 1656 painting Las Meninas.

The book is alternatively known as, Lump: The Dog Who Ate a Picasso.

References

Photographic collections and books
Art history books
Pablo Picasso
Thames & Hudson books
2006 non-fiction books